The Tiger's Prey is a 2017 novel by Wilbur Smith. It is a Courtney saga novel, set in the 18th century.

Plot

Tom Courtney, one of four sons of master mariner Sir Hal Courtney, once again sets sail on a treacherous journey that will take him across the vast reaches of the ocean and pit him against dangerous enemies in exotic destinations. But just as the winds propel his sails, passion drives his heart. Turning his ship towards the unknown, Tom Courtney will ultimately find his destiny—and lay the future for the Courtney family.

References

External links
Book announcement by HarperCollins
Tiger's Prey at Wilbur Smith books

Novels by Wilbur Smith
2017 British novels
Novels set in the 18th century
HarperCollins books